The first season of the sports entertainment reality competition series Australian Ninja Warrior premiered on 9 July  2017 on the Nine Network.  The season was hosted by Rebecca Maddern, Ben Fordham & Freddie Flintoff.

50 ninjas ran in each of the five qualifying heats, with the top 18 from each heat moving on to the semi-finals. From the three semi finals, the top 7 competitors moved on to the Grand Final. 9 Competitors finished stage one of the Grand Final, but none completed stage two. Fred Dorrington sat on top of the leaderboard for going the furthest in stage two.

Rounds

Episode 1

Heat 1 
This episode aired on 9 July 2017 and concluded with 11 finishers. Parkour twin, Dylan Pawson earned the Berocca Performance of the Night, completing the course in 58 seconds.

 Quintuple Steps
 Silk Slider
 Bridge of Blades
 Tyre Swing to Cargo Net
 Double Tilt Ladder
 Warped Wall

Episode 2

Heat 2 
This episode aired on 10 July 2017. Fastest finisher, Ashlin Herbert earned the Berocca Performance of the Night.

 Qunituple Steps
 UFO Slider
 Bridge of Blades
 Spinning Wheel to Cargo Net
 Tilting Frames
 Warped Wall

Episode 3

Heat 3 
This episode aired on 11 July 2017. Two members of Justice Crew, Sampson Smith and John Pearce both participated, both bowing out on the Bridge of Blades. The Berocca Performance of the Night was tied between Coby Head and Ricko Tralongo. Only 8 competitors completed this course, with a large number of athletes bowing out on the BOM slider.

 Qunituple Steps
 Bom Slider
 Bridge of Blades
 Cargo with Lache
 Ball & Chain
 Warped Wall

Episode 4

Heat 4 
This episode aired on 16 July 2017. NRL legend Beau Ryan competed against AFL's Adam Cooney in a battle of the codes, with Beau progressing further through the course. Deaf competitor, Paul Cashion's run caused significant public outrage due to the way it was televised. This episode ended with a tribute to Johann Ofner, who had died on the set of a music video earlier in the year. 10 competitors completed this course. The Berocca Performance of the Night went to Lee Cossey.

 Quintuple Steps
 Slide to Box Jellyfish
 Bridge of Blades
 Rings to Cargo Net
 Pipe Climber
 Warped Wall

Episode 5

Heat 5 
This episode aired on 17 July 2017 and concluded with 12 finishers. Former Bachelor Tim Robards participated but bowed out on the Cones to Cargo Net. The Berocca Performance of the Night went to Ben Polson

 Quintuple Steps
 Pole Rider
 Bridge of Blades
 Cones to Cargo Net
 Swing Cycle
 Warped Wall

Episode 6

Semi-final 1 
This episode aired on 18 July 2017. This episode had three new obstacles after the Warped Wall, the Ring Jump, Pole Grasper and Chimney Climb. This semi-final included Johann Ofner, who died on set of a music video earlier in the year, but the footage of the stunt man was edited out. Rob Patterson had the Berocca Performance of the Night. Damian Istria was unfortunately unable to complete the course as the jump hang net snapped.

 Quintuple Steps
 Log Grip
 Spinning Log
 Jump Hang
 Tyre Swing
 Warped Wall
 Ring Jump
 Pole Grasper
 Chimney Climb

Episode 7

Semi-final 2 
This episode aired on 23 July 2017. This episode had two new obstacles, Bungee Road & Flying Shelves. Andrea Hah had the Berocca Performance of the Night for being the first woman to make it up the Warped Wall.

 Quintuple Steps
 Log Grip
 Spinning Log
 Jump Hang
 Bungee Road 
 Warped Wall
 Flying Shelves
 Pole Grasper
 Chimney Climb

Episode 8

Semi-final 3 
This episode aired on 24 July 2017. This episode had two new obstacles, Big Wheel & Swinging Spikes. Ben Polson had the Berocca Performance of the Night.

 Quintuple Steps
 Log Grip
 Spinning Log
 Jump Hang
 Big Wheel
 Warped Wall
 Swinging Spikes
 Pole Grasper
 Chimney Climb

Episode 9

Grand Final 
This episode aired on Tuesday 25 July 2017. Similar to many European versions of Ninja Warrior, the Grand Final was set over three stages. Fred Dorrington had Berocca performance of the night. Dorrington was nearly disqualified after his foot thought to touch the water, but after a replay shows that the safety mat caused the ripple, Dorrington was allowed to continue from where he left off.

Stage 1

The obstacles used on Stage 1 were:
 Quintuple Steps
 Big Dipper
 Spinning Log with Donut
 Jump Hang
 Spider Jump
 Warped Wall
 Globe Grasper
 Ring Swing
 Chimney Climb

All of these obstacles had to be completed within a 3:45 time limit.

Stage 2

The remaining ninjas had to face 8 obstacles in stage 2, they had to pass the first 5 in under 65 seconds and then complete the other 3.

The obstacles used on Stage 2 were:
 Rope Jungle
 Basket Toss
 Salmon Ladder
 Unstable Bridge
 Wall Lift
 Crazy Cliffhanger
 Floating Boards
 Flying Bars

Stage 3

Stage 3 was to take on Mount Midoriyama, but all of the ninjas failed to pass stage 2.

Obstacles by episode

Viewership

References

External links
 Australian Ninja Warrior on Channel 9
 Australian Ninja Warrior - Season 1 on Channel 9
 Australian Ninja Warrior Blog, Articles, Videos & Forums

2017
2017 Australian television seasons